Kriangsak Chamanan (17 December 191723 December 2003) served as prime minister of Thailand from 1977 to 1980. After staging a successful coup, he was asked to become Prime Minister in 1977, he ruled till 1980 and is credited with "steering Thailand to democracy" in a time where internally, communist insurgents are rampant and neighbouring countries have turned to communist rule following the communist takeover of Vietnam: South Vietnam (by the Viet Cong), Laos (by the Pathet Lao), and Cambodia (by the Khmer Rouge). He died on 23 December 2003, aged 86.

Regarded as one of the most notable statesmen in modern Thailand, his landmark developmental policies include the founding of Eastern Seaboard through the founding of PTT, facilitate the building of deep-sea port in Laem Chabang and negotiating for bilateral trade agreements between Thailand and Japan through Takeo Fukuda to include Thailand in the flying geese paradigm. Chomanan founded the Petroleum Authority of Thailand and transforming it into PTT in a merger between three fragmented state-owned energy companies, serving as a major economic and industrial stimulus in the rise of Thailand secondary production economy in the 1980s and 1990s. Moreover, the founding of PTT also served to lessen the strained on energy trade reliance that has caused a severe global oil price crisis in the 1970s. His other notable works include the founding of the current largest weekend market in the world Chatuchak Market which also helps to solve Din Daeng Garbage Mountain issues, the Village Health Volunteers organization which act as a crucial model in Thailand public primary care, the founding of the Ministry of Science and Technology, the passing of the first-ever bills to include tourism in the government economic development plans and the up-gradation of Tourism Authority of Thailand from organizational level to state level, the passing of the current consumer protection acts and organizations and the founding of Sukhothai Thammathirat Open University. After his time in office, he was the only Prime Minister of Thailand until now and less than three in Asia, at the time of his membership, to have got the invitation to join InterAction Council of Former Heads of State and Government in solving various global issues

A professional soldier, in WWII he was posted in occupied Shan State. He fought against the French in the Franco-Thai War from 1940–43, serving as platoon leader, and against the communists in both the Korean War and the Vietnam War. In Korea, he served as Commander of Infantry Battalion III which have fought valiantly on the Battle of Porkchop Hill, where he was only a few of the non-citizen officers to receive the Legion of Merits. After the Korean War, Chomanan joined the United States Army Command and General Staff College at Fort Leavenworth where he is the only Thai person to be included in the Fort Leavenworth Hall of Fame.

Early life and career 
General Kriangsak Chomanan was born on December 17, 1917 in Mahachai district of Samut Sakhon Province. A district of prominent Chinese trading port on the South West of Bangkok. He was born to a wealthy business family who runs Mahachai trading company which deals in importing and exporting goods between Thailand and the Western countries and Japan. Mahachai in the 1800s and 1900s was one of Thailand largest trading port and grow to become the first city district with its own local government in 1897.

Education 
From age six to twelve, General Kriangsak attended Samut Sakhon Wittayalai and later in Patumkongka School. After graduating from his primary school, General Kriangsak moved to Bangkok to attend the prestigious Amnuay Silpha School (Its alumni include six prime ministers of Thailand) where he excelled academically.

He later attended Chulachomklao Royal Military Academy (Rongreiyn nayroy phra chulachomklao or รร.จปร.), known to have an intense training program and one of the lowest admission rate amongst learning institutions in Thailand, until he graduated in 1938. During his time in the army, he has further attended Thai Army Command and General Staff College (CGSC) and Thailand National Defence College.

After his time at the Korean War, he also got a scholarship to attend United States Army Command and General Staff College at Fort Leavenworth, Kansas, a graduate school for United States Army and sister service officers, interagency representatives, and international military officers. At Leavenworth, he has met many international acquaintances and propels his contacts internationally.

Military career 
Kriangsak fought in the Korean War as a commander of the Thai Army in the 21st Infantry Regiment, which earned the nickname "Little Tiger" for their valour. Kriangsak Chomanan showed exemplary skills as a Major, playing a pivotal role in defending Pork Chop Hill. Where on 15 March 1953, by direction of the US president and under the provision of the 1942 Act of the US Congress, then a commander in Korean War, Lieutenant Kriangsak Chomanan was only a few of non-U.S. military personnels to be awarded with the distinguished Legion of Merit (Degree of Officer) for exceptionally meritorious conduct in the performance of outstanding services.

He became a full general in 1973, and Army chief of staff a year later. Also in 1974, he secretly brokered a prisoner exchange with the Burmese government, in which the opium warlord Khun Sa was ransomed for the freedom of two Soviet doctors whom Khun Sa's followers had kidnapped.

In 1977, NARC staged a successful coup d'état against Prime Minister Thanin Kraivichien. Kravichien himself had seized power the year before, suspending the constitutional monarchy. Then General Chomanan was part of the ruling military group, the National Administrative Reform Council (NARC), that had taken control of the government. The NARC was composed entirely of what contemporaneous press reports characterised as moderate military leaders, not from the extreme right wing. The NARC was distinguished from previous military ruling groups "as an effort to institutionalize power relationships within the military in contrast to the personal factions and cliques which entered the political arena in the past." General Chomanan was then partially against his will, cited by his wife Khunying Virat Chomanan, asked to become the Prime Minister.

Premiership

Coup d'état and ascension 

Prior to Chomanan, Thanin Kraivixien administration had spiraled the country into a perilous state of civil war. Incidents of the Communist Party of Thailand (CPT) increasingly sabotages activities in rural areas across all of Thailand and of border clashes with Cambodia and Laos incidents frequent the news headlines. The administration forceful suppressive policy actually helped emboldened the CPT's popularity amongst the population. Furthermore, members and close aides of the royal family also became targets of attacks by the communist insurgents, as recorded in the assault of a helicopter assassinating the queen's secretary and a bomb explosion in same vicinity as the king while he was visiting the south of Thailand. The country-wide deterioration and increase activities of communist incidents induced actions among the Thai armed forces. The first attempt to overthrow the Thanin administration was led by General Chalad Hiranyasiri and took place in March 1977 where the coup was unsuccessful and Chalad was executed on Thanin's order. With increasing unrest, the Thanin government was successfully overthrew when a group of Thai military called Young Turks asked the 1976 coup leader (the coup that ousted the elected civilian government of Seni Pramoj and appointed the current royal favorite Thanin Kraivichien as prime minister) General Sa-ngad Chaloyu and the Supreme Commander General Kriangsak Chomanan to oust Thanin on 20 October 1977. Chomanan was later appointed as the new Prime Minister by a majority votes through both the National Assembly and the NARC, as a new Prime Minister has not yet been selected or volunteered.[8]

As Prime Minister, Kriangsak moved to moderate and neutralize his predecessor Thanin Kraivichien's severe measures, which had driven young Thai intellectuals from multiple universities to join Communist insurgencies in the countryside. In 1978, in a major risk to his political position with his right leaning supporting base, he submitted an amnesty bill to the National Legislative Assembly to release the leftist students and labor activist Bangkok 18, deemed to be wrongly jailed in 1976, in the Thammasat University Massacre. The move have greatly bolstered his international position as a South East Asian humanitarian leader as noted by commemoration from many international bodies such as that expressed by letter of congratulations from US President Jimmy Carter and Assistant Secretary of State Patricia Derian, Chief State Department official responsible for human rights and humanitarian affairs. He also started a successful amnesty program for Communists as part of a reconciliation policy.

As Prime Minister, Kriangsak is widely credited for defusing a long-running communist insurgency in northern Thailand. He is reported to have met in 1979 with Deng Xiaoping, then supreme leader of the People's Republic of China, allowing China to ship arms to the rebel Khmer Rouge in Cambodia in exchange for the PRC withdrawing its support for the communist insurgency in Thailand. These reports were confirmed contemporaneously by the Sunday Times and wire services. However, claims of a deal involving the Khmer Rouge was denied by the Thai government, which cites his offer of amnesty as the primary reason for the withdrawal of communist insurgency and policy of reunifications. The other benefit of the deal with China for Thailand was that it would not have Vietnamese troops on its border. In the same way Kriangsak had secret deals with rebel armies across the border in Burma, which provided a buffer zone against Burmese aggression.

International Relations and Foreign Policies 
One of Prime Minister Kriangsak Chomanan main accomplishment has been his normalising and improving foreign relations globally. He led the supranational rapprochement of foreign relations with neighbouring including Cambodia, Lao PDR, Vietnam, and Myanmar (CLVM) countries and foster closer relationships with Singapore, Indonesia and Malaysia. Moreover, he was one of the few leaders of a non-communist country to visit People's Republic of China and Union of Soviet Socialist Republics and to have fostered diplomatic relationships with both countries. Prime Minister Kriangsak visited Beijing in late March 1978. And 4 November 1978, where paramount leader of the People's Republic of China Deng Xiaoping returned the favour, in a significant public moment, visited Chomanan's private house and discussed political issues both on national television and privately.

In April 1975, Thailand was the first country in Southeast Asia to recognize the new regime of the communist Khmer Rouge in Phnom Penh. In October the two countries agreed in principle to resume diplomatic and economic relations; the agreement was formalized in June 1976, when they also agreed to erect border markers in poorly defined border areas.

Meanwhile, the withdrawal of all American troops from Thailand by July 1976 paved the way for the Thai-Vietnamese agreement in August on normalizing relations. In January 1978, Bangkok and Hanoi signed an accord on trade and economic and technical cooperation, agreeing also to exchange ambassadors, reopen aviation links, resolve all problems through negotiations, and consult on the question of delimiting sea boundaries. Progress toward improved relations with the Indochinese states came to an abrupt halt, however, after Vietnam invaded Cambodia in December 1978, and in January 1979 installed in Phnom Penh a new communist regime friendly to Hanoi.
This invasion not only provoked a Chinese attack on Vietnam in February 1979 but also posed a threat to Thailand's security. Chomanan could no longer rely on Cambodia as a buffer against Vietnamese power. Bangkok was forced to assume the role of a frontline state against a resurgent communist Vietnam, which had 300,000 troops in Cambodia and Laos. The Chomanan's government began increasing its defense capabilities. While visiting Washington in February 1979, Prime Minister Kriangsak Chomanan asked for and received reassurances of military support from the United States. His government also launched a major diplomatic offensive to press for the withdrawal of all Vietnamese forces from Cambodia and for continued international recognition of Democratic Kampuchea under Pol Pot's Khmer Rouge regime. As part of that offensive, Chomanan also journeyed to Moscow in March 1979, the first visit ever by a Thai prime minister. To explain the Thai position on the Cambodian question and to reassure the Soviets that Thailand's anti-Vietnamese position was neither anti-Soviet nor pro-Chinese. Such reassurances were believed to be necessary in view of Vietnamese accusations that Thailand collaborated with China and the United States in aiding and abetting the Khmer Rouge forces against the Heng Samrin regime.

The Thai offensive, backed by Bangkok's ASEAN partners, was rewarded in a United Nations (UN) General Assembly resolution adopted in November 1979. The resolution called for immediate withdrawal of all foreign forces from Cambodia, asked all nations to refrain from interfering in, or staging acts of aggression against, Cambodia, and called on the UN secretary general to explore the possibility of an international conference on Cambodia.

Kriangsak also made significant economic deals with regional neighbors. When the Malaysian Prime Minister Tun Hussein Onn arrived in Thailand to sign an oil treaty over drilling rights along the Thai-Malaysian border and in the Gulf of Thailand, both flew to the northern Thai city of Chiang Mai to sign the pact. While in a convoy on the way from the Chiang Mai airport Kriangsak ordered his limousine to stop and took Tun Hussein to a noodle shop to enjoy the "best beef noodles in Thailand". When Hussein became agitated about being late for the signing, Kriangsak reportedly took out the agreement and signed it on the spot, asking his guest: "Now would you care for some more noodles?"

Despite taking power in a military coup, the Times and the New York Times report that Kriangsak was known for leaning towards democracy. He enlisted more civilians to top jobs than any previous regime. He granted amnesty to communists and dissidents who were jailed for fighting a military crackdown in 1976. He promulgated the country's 12th constitution, and set up a timetable for full parliamentary democracy in 1979. But this democratic step reportedly cost him the support of the military.

Relations with the United States of America 
Prior to Chomanan's office, with America clearly in retreat from military involvement on the Southeast Asian mainland, Thai self-preservation dictated a policy of realignment. Within days of the Congressional cutoff of American bombing in Cambodia in August 1973, the U.S. and Thai governments announced the first drawdown of U.S. personnel in Thailand. The fall of the regime of Thanom Kittikachorn and Praphas Charusathien on 15 October 1973, added further impetus, because the student protestors, who had sparked the revolt, demanded, among other things, a more independent foreign policy for Thailand, including the removal of American bases.

In May 1974, U.S. forces in Thailand were cut to 34,000 (compared with a wartime high of 50,000 in December 1972), and statements by Thai officials clearly indicated an inclination toward complete U.S. military withdrawal. Concurrently, Thailand sought to add balance to its diplomacy by improving relations with Hanoi and Moscow. Diplomatic recognition was extended to Rumania, Outer Mongolia, and Czechoslovakia; a North Korean trade delegation visited Bangkok; and relations with China continued to warm.' During 1973-1976, a consensus developed within the Thai foreign policy elite, favoring decreased reliance upon the United States and return ing to a more traditional Thai stance of establishing cordial relations with as many contending powers as possible as the most efficacious means of protecting Thailand's sovereignty.

The governments of both Seni Promoj and Kukrit Pramoj sought complete withdrawal of American bases, improved relations with North Vietnam, and diplomatic relations with China. In late March 1975, the Thai government decided to cut the lifeline of the Lon Nol regime by stating that the U.S. government "had no right" to transship ammunition through Thailand. As the April denouement approached in Vietnam and Cambodia, Thailand's survival instincts dictated increased public resistance to U.S. security policies in Indochina.' American policymakers in the immediate aftermath of Saigon's fall made public statements indicating that previous commitments to the defense of Thailand might no longer be binding. When Secretary of Defense Schlesingerwiki was asked whether the U.S. would continue to be obligated to defend Thailand from external attack, he replied: "[I] would have to consult my lawyers." Furthermore, Secretary Kissinger omitted Thailand from a listing of defense commitments in Asia.' High American officials. seemed to be publicly undermining what little deterrent value remained in the U.S.-Thai security relationship. Perhaps the absolute nadir in U.S.-Thai security relations was reached in the closing days of 1975, when Senate Majority Leader Mike Mansfield urged the abrogation of the Manila Treaty as well as closing out American economic aid to Thailand. In June 1975, former Foreign Minister Thanat Khoman clearly elucidated the new policies to be followed by Thailand in disengaging from the U.S.-Thai alliance: "The present government is committed to following a policy of equidistance—Thailand should try to keep on the best possible terms with major powers—the U.S., Soviet Union, China, Japan, Western and Eastern Europe. If we allow one power to station troops here, we may get into trouble with another large power, or one of the smaller powers. It was not my personal feelings, but the resolution of the American Congress banning U.S. forces from taking part in overseas operations. If they can't perform military duties why are they here? As tourists? It doesn't make sense. We have seen the sad situation in South Vietnam and Cambodia of the U.S. Congress refusing credits to those countries. Executive agreements are completely meaningless if Congress is not willing to go ahead. What are promises worth if we are unsure of the position of the [American] legislative branch? If the U.S. Congress was to pass a resolution tomorrow that if Thailand were attacked the U.S. would join Thailand's defense, I would be the first to advocate that American forces remain. At present, however, they are a liability."The year 1976 was dominated by the final withdrawal of American forces from the bases in Thailand. There was a feeble American attempt to maintain a residual force, but this was rejected with a certain amount of political fanfare by Kukrit Pramoj. The U.S. response to the Thai government announcement on 20 March that U.S. military activity in Thailand must end "forthwith" was a forthright "We don't stay where we are not wanted." In the period 1973-1976, Thailand had rapidly readjusted its pattern of international relations: moving away from the U.S. (but without dissolving the relationship entirely); moving toward China (but without becoming a client); and seeking outright accommodation with Hanoi along with limited advances toward the Soviet Union.

The policy of moving away from dependence on the United States gradually eliminated American involvement in Thai politics. But when Thanin took over, his policy of suppressing Communist activities within Thailand and limiting external Communist expansion toward Thailand's borders encouraged a new series of American involvements. Yet, even though the policies of the two countries coincided, the American involvement in Thailand during this period did not quite reach the same high level as in the previous period. In 1977, SEATO was dissolved and the U.S. cut back its aid programs to Thailand.

Chomanan came to power in November 1977 and quickly adopted a new and actively independent foreign policy, compared to Thanin's rigid stance. He travelled extensively, visiting the People's Republic of China and the Soviet Union, in addition to the United States. With his own unique style of "survival diplomacy," Chomanan tried to reestablish more balanced relations with the rest of the world. However, Chomanan also succeeded to a certain extent in convincing the U.S. government of Thai land's strategic importance and persuaded the US. to adopt a more "credible" policy toward Thailand. It was becoming apparent that it was in the interest of the United States to help Thailand and ASEAN develop then resilience, and that, bilaterally, the United States could afford to improve close relations with Thailand while playing an important role in encouraging indigenous regionalism capable of coping with political and security problems.

Toward the end of his premiership, Chomanan was able to restore close and friendly relations with the United States. Although anti-Americanism still existed, it was at a low level, compared to what it had been during the Thanom-Prapass period.

Relations with neighbouring states 
General Kriangsak Chamanan positions toward Vietnam following the December 1978 invasion of Cambodia have been remarkably steadfast, and therefore we tend to forget that Thai foreign policy in 1973-1978 was based on diplomatic flexibility and accommodation with Hanoi and Phnom Penh. This basic policy was present even during the stridently anti-Communist government of Prime Minister Thanin Kraivichien (October 1976-October 1977). Immediately after the October 1976 coup, which reasserted the military role in Thai politics. General Kriangsak Chomanan (Secretary-General of the National Administrative Reform Council) reiterated the policy of détente: "We want good relations with Laos, Vietnam, and Cambodia" and "our policy towards China has not changed." Clashes with the Khmer Rouge occurred repeatedly along the border." With typical lack of balance, the Khmer Rouge involved themselves in border conflicts with Vietnam, Laos, and Thailand simultaneously. Thai policy in responding to the Khmer Rouge differed markedly from Vietnam ese responses to similar incidents. Whereas the Thais never ceased protest ing the frequent and terrible border violations, Thailand nevertheless continued its pursuit of a diplomatic solution. In contrast, the Vietnamese response to Khmer Rouge activity was entirely military: escalation and counterstrikes by both sides led eventually to full-scale war and invasion. Thailand, especially under the government of General Kriangsak, calculated that the most serious threat to Democratic Kampuchea came from Vietnam and that the Khmer Rouge must eventually come to terms with Thailand if they were to have any chance whatever of survival. In response to a series of vicious raids across the Thai border. Prime Minister Kriangsak stated that the Thai government would accelerate its efforts to establish better relations with Cambodia. Bangkok even provided possible rationales for the border violations. For example. General Kriangsak suggested that confusion and poor communication between the border area and Phnom Penh, or, alternately, inaccurate maps might explain the border incidents, Thailand went out of its way to play down the border incidents.'" As Vietnam and Democratic Kampuchea engaged in conflict, both antagonists sought better relations with Thailand. Military security along the Thai-Cambodian border improved slowly after Thai Foreign Minister Upadit Pachariyangkun's "goodwill visit" to Phnom Penh in late January 1978, which resulted in an agreement to exchange ambassadors.'^ During 1978, Thailand displayed a nearly awesome ability to fine-tune its foreign policy; even while the border raids into its territory continued in February, government spokesmen reiterated the contention that the border situation had improved. When fifty Thais were killed, Thailand sent a "report" rather than a "protest" note, because "Cambodian leaders might not know what is happening on the border."

Kriangsak also strengthened relations with the United States, and was warmly received in his first state visit to the White House with U.S. President Jimmy Carter on 6 February 1979. According to the internal talking points prepared for Carter, the President cited the close historical relations as well as economic and regional cooperation in Southeast Asia.

Honorable Resignation 
Chomanan voluntarily resigned in February 1980, telling parliament that he no longer felt he had the support of the public. He was the first and only leader of a coup in Thailand ever to resign voluntarily, and was celebrated and cited until this day for his honorable decision, often cited in comparison to many of Thailand past Military Government. It was reported that the primary cause for his loss of support was rising prices, particularly of oil, electricity and other commodities. "I have decided to resign the prime ministership so that democracy can be maintained," Kriangsak told a special session of parliament, which had gathered to debate his governments policies before a vote of confidence. He said his intention was "to open the way for other capable people to administer the country."

He was succeeded by General Prem Tinsulanonda, his former longtime aide. In 1981 he re-entered politics at the head of a new political party, the National Democratic Party, which emerged as the only credible political opposition to Prem.

Kriangsak was survived by his wife Khun Ying (Lady) Virat Chomanan, son Major General Pongpipat Chomanan and daughter Ratanawan.

Humanitarian principles

The case of the Cambodian Refugees 
Large influxes of Cambodian refugees took place between 1979 and 1980, after Vietnamese troops invaded Cambodia and which the Heng Samrin regime overthrew Pol Pot's Khmer Rouge regime in December 1978, In late 1979, in pursuit of a better life, thousands of Cambodians refugees, victims of a political tragedy that has shocked the world, migrate to Thailand, fleeing war, starvation and disease.

After the devastating war, 200,000 Cambodian refugees were estimated to be on the border attempting to enter Thailand. On 18 October 1979, on a visit to the Thai-Cambodian border, Thai prime minister Chomanan was shocked when he saw the appalling condition. After two days, taking a major political risk, he altered the government's policy towards the refugees. Where, he declared a new "open door" policy granting temporary asylum to Cambodian refugees; to political and societal voices of the time, Thailand would still not recognize them as refugees but, prime minister Chomaman way, would rescue them from the perilous border and place them in a freer "holding centers". On 22 October, a Thai colonel contacted UNHCR and said that the Chomanan's government had decided to additionally admit 90,000 Cambodians who were situated on the border. Under, prime minister Chomanan, Thai military planned to begin relocating them to a site near the town of Sa Kaeo within two days. Sa Kaeo Holding Center was about 64 kilometres west of the border near the town of Sa Kaeo and 209 kilometres by road from east of Bangkok.

Refoulement of Cambodian Refugees 
Also during Chomaman premiership, it was speculated by an official that Thailand's government carried out the forcible repatriation of up to 45,000 Cambodian refugees who were forcibly expelled from the country by having them walk down a steep slope and over a minefield in one of the worst refoulements in history with over 3000 refugees dying in the process and those that refused claimed to be shot by Thai soldiers.

Honours
received the following royal decorations in the Honours System of Thailand:

 1978 -  Knight Grand Cross of the Most Illustrious Order of Chula Chom Klao
 1974 -  Knight Grand Cordon of the Most Exalted Order of the White Elephant
 1968 -  Knight Grand Cordon of the Most Noble Order of the Crown
 1962 -  Victory Medal - World War II
 1953 -  Victory Medal - Korean War
 1978 -  Freemen Safeguarding Medal (First Class)
 1968 -  Border Service Medal
 1953 -  Chakra Mala Medal
 1978 -  First Class of Boy Scout Citation Medal of Vajira
 1978 -  King Bhumibol Adulyadej's Royal Cypher Medal, 1st

Foreign Honours
 :
 1979 -  Honorary Grand Commander of the Order of the Defender of the Realm

 :
  Republic of Korea Presidential Unit Citation
 2013 - Recognised as foreign combatant in the Korean War on 60th anniversary of that conflict (2013)

:
  Legion of Merit (Officer Degree)

:
 1978 -  Grand Collar of the Order of Sikatuna

Citations and References

External links
 Official biography

Kriangsak Chamanan
Kriangsak Chamanan
Kriangsak Chamanan
Kriangsak Chamanan
Kriangsak Chamanan
Kriangsak Chamanan
1917 births
2003 deaths
Kriangsak Chamanan
Kriangsak Chamanan
Leaders who took power by coup
Kriangsak Chamanan